146 (one hundred [and] forty-six) is the natural number following 145 and preceding 147.

In mathematics
146 is an octahedral number, the number of spheres that can be packed into in a regular octahedron with six spheres along each edge. For an octahedron with seven spheres along each edge, the number of spheres on the surface of the octahedron is again 146. It is also possible to arrange 146 disks in the plane into an irregular octagon with six disks on each side, making 146 an octo number.

There is no integer with exactly 146 coprimes less than it, so 146 is a nontotient. It is also never the difference between an integer and the total of coprimes below it, so it is a noncototient. And it is not the sum of proper divisors of any number, making it an untouchable number.

There are 146 connected partially ordered sets with four labeled elements.

See also
 146 (disambiguation)

References

Integers